Machha is a  town in Akkar Governorate, Lebanon. Its population comprises mostly Sunni Muslims.

History
In 1838, Eli Smith noted the village as Meshha, located east of esh-Sheikh Mohammed. The residents were  Sunni Muslims and Greek Orthodox Christians.

References

Bibliography

External links
 Machha, Localiban 

Populated places in Akkar District
Eastern Orthodox Christian communities in Lebanon
Sunni Muslim communities in Lebanon